Salla disease (SD) is an autosomal recessive lysosomal storage disease characterized by early physical impairment and intellectual disability. It was first described in 1979, after Salla, a municipality in Finnish Lapland and is one of 40 Finnish heritage diseases.

Approximately ~250 individuals with FSASD have been reported in the literature, of which the majority (> 160 cases) are of Finnish or Swedish ancestry. Individuals with FSASD may go misdiagnosed or undiagnosed, making it difficult to determine the true frequency of the disease in the general population.

Signs and symptoms
Affected infants appear normal at birth but may develop symptoms during the first year of life. Individuals with Salla disease may present with nystagmus as well as hypotonia, and difficulty coordinating voluntary movements (ataxia), reduced muscle tone and strength, and cognitive impairment. The most severely impaired children do not walk or acquire language, but the typical patient learns to walk and speak and has normal life expectancy. The MRI shows arrested or delayed myelination.

Approximately two-thirds of children with mild FSASD eventually learn to walk. Some degree of speech impairment is usually present. Affected infants may learn single words or small sentences, but this ability may be lost as they age. The ability to produce speech is affected more severely than the ability to understand speech. Affected children exhibit some degree of cognitive impairment as well.

Genetics

SD is caused by a mutation in the SLC17A5 gene, located at human chromosome 6q14-15.  This gene codes for sialin, a lysosomal membrane protein that transports the charged sugar, N-acetylneuraminic acid (sialic acid), out of lysosomes. The mutation causes sialic acid to build up in the cells.

The disease is inherited in an autosomal recessive manner. This means the defective gene responsible for the disorder is located on an autosome (chromosome 6 is an autosome), and two copies of the defective gene (one inherited from each parent) are required in order to be born with the disorder. The parents of an individual with an autosomal recessive disorder both carry one copy of the defective gene, but usually do not experience any signs or symptoms of the disorder.

Diagnosis
A diagnosis of this disorder can be made by measuring urine to look for elevated levels of free sialic acid. Prenatal testing is also available for known carriers of this disorder.

Treatment
There is no cure for Salla disease. Treatment is limited to controlling the symptoms of this disorder. Anti-convulsant medication may control seizure episodes. Physical therapists can assist an affected individual to build muscle strength and coordination.

Prognosis
The life expectancy for individuals with Salla disease is between the ages of 50 and 60.

See also
 Infantile free sialic acid storage disease (ISSD)

References

External links 
 GeneReview/NIH/UW entry on Free Sialic Acid Storage Disorders

Autosomal recessive disorders
Rare diseases
Glycoprotein metabolism disorders
Membrane transport protein disorders